The Ngiao rebellion in 1902 was an uprising of Tai Yai (Shan, historically known in Thai as Ngiao) people against Siamese rule, in what is now Phrae province in northern Thailand. It arose as resistance to centralizing reforms initiated by King Chulalongkorn, particularly the levying of taxes and the adoption of the Monthon Thesaphiban provincial administration system, as well as the partitioning of territory with the British, which forced the Shan to adopt either British or Siamese nationality. In the morning of 25 July 1902, rebels attacked and looted the town of Phrae, killing over twenty government officials including the royal commissioner, Phraya Ratcharitthanon. The rebellion was soon quelled by troops from Bangkok led by Chaophraya Surasakmontri.

The revolt was part of several acts of resistance that arose in the fringes of the country in the 1890s to early 1900s. A few months earlier, the Holy Man's Rebellion in the Northeast saw rebels sack the town of Khemmarat before being routed by the Siamese army. While it was unclear whether and to what extent the local rulers supported the rebellion in Phrae, the local lordship of Phrae was ended, and further reforms were put into place that helped Siam fully annex the former lands of Lanna and assimilate its people.

References

Further reading

Rebellions in Thailand
1902 in Siam
Conflicts in 1902
Rama V period